Berlin Mosque in Berlin is situated on Brienner Straße 7-8 in Berlin-Wilmersdorf. It was designed by  Hermann and was built between 1923 and 1925. Berlin Mosque, which has two  minarets, was heavily damaged in World War II. The two minarets were rebuilt in 1999/2001. 

The foundation stone was laid on 6 August 1923  and the mosque was inaugurated officially on 26 April 1925.

The style of the space is built in Mughal Architectural style, reflecting the great buildings of that time with signature stylings. One such styling is the architects use of onion dome and pastel colors. This makes the building very similar to the tombs of the Mughal Empire. Not only that, but the symmetry seen in the building reflects that of the Taj Mahal. Next to the mosque is the residence of the Imam, the religious head of the mosque. The Imam's residence stands at two stories tall.

The mosque is owned and maintained by the Lahore Ahmadiyya Movement (Ahmadiyya Anjuman Isha'at-i-Islam Lahore).

History 
Due to the small influence Islam had in Germany prior to the building of the mosque in the 1900s, the Berlin Mosque was preceded by a small wooden structure built outside of Berlin, which was destroyed in 1923. Not long after, the Lahore Ahmadiyya Movement, who saw the need to construct a mosque in Germany, did so. The Berlin Mosque's tall minarets were heavily damaged in World War II due to an attack by Russian soldiers. Not only were the minarets damaged but the dome received damage as well. After receiving funds from the Berlin Monuments Department to restore the building, the mosque was able to be reopened in 1952.

Berlin Muslim Mission and the Berlin Mosque

The Plan for an Islamic Centre 
In February of 1920, Indian Muslim political activist Pro. Abdul Jabbar Kheri met a German Muslim, Dr. Khalid Banning and began to consider the prospects of setting up an Islamic Centre in Berlin. While he considered this with Dr. Khalid Banning, Pro Abdul Jabbar Kheri received letters originally written to the Imam of the Woking Muslim Mission of England from a German lady suggesting the opening of a mission in Berlin following the basis of the Woking Muslim Mission of the Shah Jehan Mosque. His brother, Pro. Sattar Kheri sent the letters out to the Imam of the Mosque at Woking, Maulana Mustafa Khan and from there it reached the Lahore Ahmadiyya Movement (Ahmadiyya Anjuman Isha'at-i-Islam Lahore). The purview and the viability of the plan was considered and eventually accepted by the Lahore Movement.

The Need For The Propagation of Islam in Germany 
In May 1922, the Mohammadan, a popular English newspaper in India, published an article with the title "The Need for the Propagation of Islam in Germany". The article was written by Pro. Abdus Sattar Kheri, an Indian Muslim political activist living in Berlin. He and his brother, Pro. Abdul Jabbar Kheri, were known as the Kheri Brothers and were the ones that initiated the idea of setting up an Islamic centre in Germany. They both played a significant role in leading the organization of Muslims in the German capital in the early 1920's.

Structural Details about the Mosque

See also
Ahmadiyya in Germany
Islam in Germany
Religion in Berlin
List of mosques in Europe

References

 “Berliner Moschee, Germany.” Archnet, https://next.archnet.org/sites/14801.
 RIZVI, KISHWAR. The Transnational Mosque: Architecture and Historical Memory in the Contemporary Middle East. University of North Carolina Press, 2015, http://www.jstor.org/stable/10.5149/9781469621173_rizvi.
 Terrell, Robert Shea. “Building the Berlin Mosque: An Episode in Weltpolitik.” Contemporary European History, vol. 30, no. 1, 2021, pp. 46–59., doi:10.1017/S0960777320000454.
 Structurae. “Ahmadiyya Mosque (Berlin-Wilmersdorf, 1928).” Structurae, Structurae, https://structurae.net/en/structures/ahmadiyya-mosque.
 Ahmad, Nasir. “Die Berliner Moschee .” AAIIL, https://aaiil.org/german/historyofberlin/90thanniversaryofBerlinMosque.pdf.

Further reading 

 Nath, R. (Ram), 1933- (1982-<2005>). History of Mughal architecture. New Delhi: Abhinav. . OCLC 9944798.
 Religious architecture : anthropological perspectives. Verkaaik, Oskar,. Amsterdam: Amsterdam University Press. 2013. . OCLC 869720783.
Jonker, Gerdien (2019). "Das Moscheearchiv in Berlin-Wilmersdorf: Zwischen muslimischer Moderne und deutscher Lebensreform". In MIDA Archival Reflexicon, pp. 1-10.

External links

 The Berlin Mosque on the official website Berlin.de: http://www.berlin.de/ba-charlottenburg-wilmersdorf/bezirk/lexikon/islamischemoschee.html

Buildings and structures in Charlottenburg-Wilmersdorf
Ahmadiyya mosques in Germany
Mosques completed in 1925
1925 establishments in Germany
Mosques in Berlin
Mosque buildings with domes